Zenith is the debut studio album by Australian pop singer Alfie Arcuri. The album includes two original tracks as well as full length re-recorded studio version of songs he performed on the fifth season of The Voice Australia, where he won. The album was released through Universal Music Australia on 29 July 2016 and debuted and peaked at number 5 on the ARIA Albums Chart.

Track listing

Charts

Release history

References

2016 debut albums
Universal Music Australia albums